Kelvin Atkinson (born April 8, 1969) is a former Democratic member of the Nevada Senate, representing District 4. He previously served in the Nevada Assembly, representing Clark County District 17 from 2002 to 2012.

On April 22, 2013, during a debate on repealing Nevada's gay marriage ban, Atkinson announced on the Senate floor that: "I’m black. I'm gay." It was the first time he had publicly identified as gay. He became the fifth openly LGBT member of the Nevada legislature, alongside Senators David Parks and Patricia Spearman and Assemblymembers James Healey and Andrew Martin.

Atkinson and his partner were the first same-sex couple to marry in Nevada, which occurred on October 9, 2014.

Resignation and Federal Charges 

On March 5, 2019, Kelvin Atkinson resigned amid federal charges accusing him of misusing campaign funds for personal use.

He was later convicted of fraud.

On July 18, 2019, a federal judge ordered Atkinson to serve 27 months in prison and pay $249,900 in restitution for his misuse of campaign funds.

References

External links 

Nevada Assembly - Kelvin D. Atkinson official government website
Project Vote Smart - Representative Kelvin Atkinson (NV) profile
Follow the Money - Kelvin Atkinson
2006 2004 2002 1998 campaign contributions

1969 births
21st-century American politicians
Gay politicians
Howard University alumni
LGBT people from Illinois
LGBT state legislators in Nevada
Living people
Democratic Party members of the Nevada Assembly
Nevada politicians convicted of crimes
Democratic Party Nevada state senators
People from North Las Vegas, Nevada
Politicians from Chicago